The Rehearsal may refer to:

 The Rehearsal (play), a 1672 play by George Villiers
 The Rehearsal (1974 film), about the Greek junta
 The Rehearsal (novel), a 2008 novel by Eleanor Catton
 The Rehearsal (2016 film), a New Zealand film based on the novel
 The Rehearsal (TV series), a television series by Nathan Fielder
 The Rehearsal, a 1992 album by Christie Hennessy
 "The Rehearsal", a season one episode of the 2014 web series Mozart in the Jungle

See also
 Rehearsal (disambiguation)
 Dress rehearsal (disambiguation)